Steven Rumbelow (also credited as Steve Rumbelow, 30 July 1949 − 27 February 2016), was a director in the entertainment industry for more than four decades.  He began in theatre at the Bristol Old Vic, subsequently becoming the youngest director for the Royal Shakespeare Company in London before forming Triple Action Theatre and then later starting on films.  His career has been a melange between media productions and theatre ever since.   Rumbelow operated his own production company in Toronto, Ontario, Canada, Renegade Motion Pictures, with his wife, Rachel, until his sudden death from sepsis on 27 February 2016.

Early life
Rumbelow was born in Bristol on 30 July 1949. His mother was Rita Rumbelow, who later became a costume designer and wardrobe mistress with the BBC. His father was Mike Marino, a professional wrestler. At age 16 he took a summer job as a stagehand at the Bristol Old Vic and was promoted to technical stage manager within six weeks. He started directing professionally the following year.

Theatre
With his career in theatre started at Bristol Old Vic he moved to London aged eighteen and worked with an experimental unit of the Royal Shakespeare Company. He adapted Christopher Marlowe's Dr. Faustus into a 60-minute play that was so successful; he began the show in 1971 and toured all over the world with it until the late nineties. Rumbelow has directed around 150 theatre productions around the world and has written for the stage, screen and television. He founded Triple Action Company, one of the world's foremost physical theatre companies, and was involved with the Company for fourteen years.

Following a move to Canada he started a post-graduate improvisation program at York University in Toronto. Establishing contacts throughout North America, he also worked extensively as a director in Chicago.

Film
Renegade Motion Pictures was founded by Rumbelow and credits include feature films, television, commercials and music videos.

Renegade filmography
 Autumn - 2009 - adapted from the novel by David Moody
 Beyond, The Series - 2005 - 2007 - currently airing on Space
 The Deed (previously titled The Covenant) - (post-production) 2007
 Lost Souls - (post-production) 2007
 Queen City Blowout - (re-release) 2007
 Rocking Horse Dreams - (full-length documentary) - 2004
 Ghosts - (90 minute documentary) 1998 - aired on Space
 The Proteus Chronicles - (feature film) 1999

Independent filmography
 King Lear - (feature film) 1976
 Saint Joan - (feature film) 1977
 Faust - (feature film) 1980

References

External links
 
 

1949 births
2016 deaths
British film directors
British theatre directors